This is a list of U.S. Highways in Illinois, all of which are owned and maintained by the U.S. state of Illinois. The Illinois Department of Transportation (IDOT) is responsible for maintaining the U.S Highways in Illinois. The system in Illinois consists of 21 primary highways.


Mainline highways

Special routes

See also

References

 
U.S. Highways